Lihula is a town in Lääneranna Parish, Pärnu County, Estonia.

Lihula castle 
The castle of Lihula was first mentioned in 1211, but it appears the site was used as a fortress since the Iron Age. In 1220, a Swedish army started constructing a castle here, but were defeated by Estonian forces on 8 August 1220, in the Battle of Lihula.

In 1238, however, the bishop of Saare-Lääne constructed a crusader fortress at the site, in cooperation with the Teutonic Order. This attempt was more successful and the castle became one of the residences of the bishop. The Teutonic Order also used the castle as a centre of their commandry between 1241 and 1477. In 1560, the estate was reportedly granted to alderman Gerdt Bellingshausen by Duke Magnus of Holstein.
In the course of the Livonian War, the castle was destroyed.

Lihula Manor

Despite the fact that the castle was destroyed during the Livonian War, a new manorial estate grew up right next to the original location thereafter. In the 1630s, it was recorded as the property of the Swedish general Åke Tott. The manor stayed in the Tott family until 1684, after which it belonged to various aristocratic families. The present neoclassicist manor house was built in the early 19th century.

Episcopal See 
From 1211, it was the see of the Roman Catholic Diocese of Leal (also known as bishopric of Estonia), which was however suppressed as such in 1235, to establish on the same territory the Diocese of Dorpat, a prince-bishopric, which lasted till 1558, falling victim to the Reformation.

Lihula Monument 
For a short period there was a monument in Lihula, honoring those Estonian soldiers who fought in the Wehrmacht against the Soviet Union during World War II.
 
By the order of prime minister Juhan Parts, the authorities removed the monument and as of June 2007, it stands in the Museum of Fight for Estonia's Freedom in Tallinn.

Gallery

See also 
Pärnu County
Matsalu National Park
Monument of Lihula

References

External links 

Lihula castle and manor at Estonian Manors Portal

Cities and towns in Estonia
Former municipalities of Estonia
Kreis Wiek